Hugh Donald McCutcheon  (born 13 October 1969), a native of Christchurch, New Zealand, is a former volleyball coach. He previously coached the US men's and women's national volleyball team, and was the head coach for the University of Minnesota's women's volleyball team from 2012–2022. Starting in January 2023, McCutcheon is the assistant athletics director/sport development coach at Minnesota, after announcing his resignation from the volleyball team at the conclusion of the 2022 season.

McCutcheon was a New Zealand national team volleyball player. He played on the New Zealand junior and senior national teams from 1988 to 1990 before coming to the United States and lettered in volleyball and field hockey at Shirley Boys' High School. He was also a member of New Zealand’s national team in 1996 and represented his country on the FIVB Beach Volleyball World Tour in 1997.

College 
McCutcheon played for Brigham Young University from 1991 to 1993 after transferring from the University of Canterbury in New Zealand.

After receiving his bachelor’s degree in physical education from BYU in 1993, McCutcheon played professionally for two years in Finland and Japan before returning to BYU to complete his master’s degree in exercise science in 1998. In 1999, McCutcheon received an MBA from BYU’s Marriott School of Management.

Coaching history 
McCutcheon was the top assistant coach and recruiter under head coach Carl McGown for BYU from 1995 to 2001. During that time, the Cougars posted a record of 138-44 and captured two NCAA men’s volleyball championships (1999 and 2001).

After leaving BYU, McCutcheon was the head coach of the Vienna Hotvolleys in Austria for two seasons. In his first season there, the Hotvolleys won the 2001-02 Inter-Liga, Austrian Cup and Austrian League championships, and he had the opportunity to work with USA national team players Rich Lambourne, Dave McKienzie, Adam Naeve, Reid Priddy and Brandon Taliaferro. He also coached the first Austrian team to ever beat an Italian A1 opponent.

McCutcheon also served as a volunteer assistant coach for the men’s national team, helping out during the 2001 Volleyball World League, the 2002 World Championships and on five international tours. He has also served as the head coach of the USA Boys Youth National Team in 2000 and 2001. He joined USA Volleyball as a full-time assistant coach for the men’s national team program in April 2003.

On 3 February 2005, USA Volleyball introduced McCutcheon as the new head coach of the USA men’s national volleyball team. He took over the position from long-time head coach Doug Beal, who resigned to become the new Chief Executive Officer of USA Volleyball.

On 15 December 2008, it was announced that McCutcheon accepted the head coach position of the U.S. Women's National Team for the 2009-2012 Olympic quadrennial.

On 10 February 2011, McCutcheon was named head coach of the University of Minnesota's volleyball team. He joined the Gophers on 30 August 2012 after fulfilling his obligations with the National Team.

On 10 October 2022, University of Minnesota Director of Athletics Mark Coyle announced that Hugh McCutcheon will transition to a newly create role of Assistant Athletic Director/Sport Development Coach effective on 1 January 2023.

US Men's National Team head coach 
The team went 27–6 in McCutcheon's first year as head coach and won five medals in five tournaments. They earned a silver medal at the USOC International Sports Invitational in San Diego, California, gold medals at the America's Cup in Brazil, the FIVB World Championship Qualifying Tournament in Puerto Rico and the NORCECA Continental Championship in Canada and another silver medal at the FIVB World Grand Champions Cup in Japan.

The squad posted wins over the 2004 Olympic gold and silver medalists during the year (Brazil and Italy, respectively), registered the highest winning percentage of any men’s national team since 1988 (.818) and recorded the most wins by a men’s team since 2000 (27). The Americans finished the year by winning 18 of their last 19 matches, including 14-straight at one point and ranked fifth in the world.

In 2008, the US men's national team led by McCutcheon won the Volleyball World League. He led the USA men's volleyball team to the gold medal at the 2008 Summer Olympics in Beijing for the first time since 1988, defeating gold-medal favorite Brazil in four sets. This is the third gold medal overall for the men's volleyball team with the first being won in 1984.

US Women's National Team head coach 
At the 2012 Olympics, the USA Women's Team advanced to the gold medal game. However, they lost to Brazil in four sets.

Head Coaching record

Personal life

On 9 August 2008, the day after the opening ceremony of the Beijing Summer Olympics, the parents of McCutcheon's wife, former Olympian Elisabeth Bachman, were attacked at Drum Tower. His father-in-law Todd Bachman was killed and his mother-in-law Barbara Bachman was seriously injured. A 47-year-old Chinese man named Tang Yongming assaulted them at the Drum Tower eight kilometres from the main Olympic site before leaping to his death from the 40-metre high balcony. McCutcheon was away from the team for 3 matches during the tournament, before returning to lead the team to the gold medal.

Individual awards and honours
 2007 NORCECA Men's Championship "Best Coach"
 2011 NORCECA Women's Championship "Eugenio Laffita Award"
 2015 Big Ten Coach of the Year
 2015 AVCA Coach of the Year

In the 2016 Queen's Birthday Honours, McCutcheon was appointed a Member of the New Zealand Order of Merit for services to volleyball.

References

External links 
 Hugh McCutcheon's official staff bio at USA Volleyball
 

1969 births
Living people
American men's volleyball players
BYU Cougars men's volleyball players
American volleyball coaches
Minnesota Golden Gophers women's volleyball coaches
New Zealand men's volleyball players
New Zealand volleyball coaches
American Olympic coaches
Brigham Young University alumni
National team coaches
Sportspeople from Christchurch
People educated at Shirley Boys' High School
Members of the New Zealand Order of Merit